Padum (also known as Padam) is the main town and the administrative centre of the Zanskar tehsil in Kargil district, Ladakh, India. Name after the Buddhist guru Padmasambhava, it was historically one of the two main capitals of the Zanskar Kingdom, the other being Zangla. It is  via the link road from Kargil city (National Highway No. 1D).  The new Nimmu–Padum–Darcha road (under construction) connects Padum directly to Leh in the east and to Darcha in Himachal Pradesh.

Description
The present population of Padum town is about 2,000 people. The traditional heart of the village is below the gompa and Palace khar (now in ruins) where two large chortens stand above old buildings. A road was constructed in 1980 from NH1 at Kargil over Pensi La, which is 235 km away. The 145 km road to Darcha passing through Shinkula pass is now operational, connecting to the Manali-Leh Highway.
Padum has several hotels, homestays and restaurants for tourists. Padum has a post office, internet cafes and telephone booths.

Geography
Padum is at the centre of the tri-armed Zanskar valley. There are several villages to the north-east of Padum leading to Karsha monastery.

People

Padum is largely inhabited by people of Tibetan descent who follow Tibetan Buddhism, but there is a sizable Muslim population (accounting for ~40% of the town's population and growing steadily), mainly Balti, who have been present in Padum since the 17th century.

Town 

The sub-divisional capital Padum is a town of the Zanskar sub-division or tehsil in the Kargil district of Ladakh state, India. The Zanskar River flows through the valley from its source at the Drang Drung glacier of the Pensi La. The Zanskar River joins the Lungnak River near Pibiting village.

A number of notable Buddhist monasteries are located near Padum, including Bardan Monastery and Karsha Monastery and the newly built Dalai Lama Photang. The Phugtal Monastery is accessible from here. It is a day's trek from Dorzang, the end of the road leading from Padum.

Access 
A bus operates between 1 June and 30 September, after which the Manali-Leh (NH21) highway is normally closed. Other roads, including the highway from Leh to Srinagar via Kargil, remain open until the end of October. Despite heavy blizzards, the road from Leh to Nubra valley over the extremely high Khardung La remains open year-round.

The Nimmu–Padam–Darcha road is being made which runs through Padum. The road to Darcha via Purne is now open, and half its length is now 2-lane tarmac, with the remainder unpaved.

See also
 India-China Border Roads 
 Line of Actual Control
 List of disputed territories of India

References

Bibliography
 Janet Rizvi. (1996). Ladakh: Crossroads of High Asia. Second Edition. Oxford University Press, Delhi. .
Osada et al. (2000). Mapping the Tibetan World. Yukiyasu Osada, Gavin Allwright, and Atsushi Kanamaru. Reprint: 2004. Kotan Publishing, Tokyo. .
 Schettler, Margaret & Rolf (1981). Kashmir, Ladakh & Zanskar. Lonely Planet Publications. South Yarra, Victoria, Australia. .

External links 
 Photos of Padum
 Images taken at the Karsha Monastery, near Padum

Cities and towns in Kargil district
Ladakh 
Geography of Ladakh